Banksia ashbyi subsp. ashbyi is a recently recognised subspecies of Banksia ashbyi. It is the non-lignotuberous arborescent form of the species, which occurs between Geraldton and Shark Bay, and in the Kennedy Ranges.

Description
This subspecies is essentially the fire-sensitive tree form of B. ashbyi. It grows as a tree or shrub up to seven metres in height, and lacks a lignotuber. This is in contrast to the other subspecies, B. ashbyi subsp. boreoscaia, which is a lignotuberous shrub that reaches no higher than two metres. In addition, B. ashbyi subsp. ashbyi usually has deep green leaves, whereas those of B. ashbyi subsp. boreoscaia are consistently grey-green in colour.

Distribution and habitat
Banksia ashbyi subsp. ashbyi occurs in two disjunct populations: between Geraldton and Shark Bay, and around 400 kilometres further north in the Kennedy Range.

Taxonomy
Although distinct lignotuberous and non-lignotuberous forms of B. ashbyi had long been recognised, they were not formally described as taxa until 2008, when Alex George published the lignotuberous form as B. ashbyi subsp. boreoscaia, thus invoking the autonym B. ashbyi subsp. ashbyi for the non-lignotuberous form.

References

External links

ashbyi subsp. ashbyi
Eudicots of Western Australia
Plant subspecies
Endemic flora of Western Australia